The third series of Junior MasterChef Australia, the second spin-off of the Australian reality television series MasterChef Australia, premiered on 11 October 2020 after a nine-year hiatus. The judging panel consists of Andy Allen, Melissa Leong and Jock Zonfrillo. The winner would receive $25,000.

Production

On 27 April 2020, it was announced that a third season of Junior MasterChef Australia had been commissioned, nine years after the second series aired. Casting was open to children aged between nine and fourteen.

Andy Allen, Melissa Leong and Jock Zonfrillo will undertake the role of judges in the new season. The series was filmed at the Melbourne Showgrounds in Flemington.

Due to COVID-19 pandemic in Australia, the same health rules apply as the Back to Win season. This includes social distancing and having individual tasting plates for each judge.

Top 14
The Top 14 contestants were announced on 29 September 2020. One of the contestants included Ryan Cheliah, the son of Season 10 winner Sashi Cheliah.

Guest Chefs

Elimination Table

Ratings and episodes

References

2020 Australian television seasons
MasterChef Australia